Ayasofya Mosque may refer to:
 Hagia Sophia in Fatih, Istanbul, Turkey, first a church, then a mosque, then a museum, now again a mosque.
 Little Hagia Sophia, in Istanbul, Turkey, a former church converted into a mosque.
 Hagia Sophia, İznik, Turkey, first a church, then a mosque, then a museum, now again a mosque.
 Selimiye Mosque, Nicosia, North Cyprus, first a church, now a Mosque.
 Saint Sophia Church, Sofia, Bulgaria, first a church, then a mosque, now again a church.
 Hagia Sophia, Thessaloniki, Greece, first a church, then a mosque, now again a church.
 Hagia Sophia, Mystras, Greece, first a church, then a mosque, now again a church.
 Hagia Sophia, Trabzon, Turkey, first a church, then a mosque, then a museum, now again a mosque.